Sörling Valley is an ice-free valley between Cumberland East Bay and Hound Bay on the north side of South Georgia. Surveyed by the SGS in the period 1951–57. Named by the United Kingdom Antarctic Place-Names Committee (UK-APC) for Erik Sörling of the Riksmuseum, Stockholm, who made zoological collections in South Georgia in 1904–05. Nearby features include Ellerbeck Peak, a mountain on the south side of the valley.

The Barff Peninsula projects northwest from Sörling Valley.

References 

Landforms of South Georgia
Falklands War in South Georgia